CBME may refer to:

 CBME-FM, a radio station (88.5 FM) licensed to Montreal, Quebec, Canada
 Computer-Based Math education